The Flamant-class patrol vessel are a series of three Type OPV54 patrol boats of the French Navy used for fishery monitoring, search and rescue, and patrolling France's exclusive economic zone out to .

The three boats were ordered in August 1993 and entered service in October and December 1997. They are based at Cherbourg.

In addition to their usual facilities the boats are also equipped with two  tanks for anti-pollutants, and a water cannon for fire fighting. They have a plant capable of producing 15 tonnes of fresh water per day by reverse osmosis. The boats have an area for vertical replenishment.

Replacement of this class is currently envisaged after 2026 with a new class of significantly larger patrol vessels.

Ships
 P676 Flamant, laid down March 1994, launched 24 April 1995, entered service 18 December 1997.

 P677 Cormoran, laid down 25 May 1994, launched 15 May 1995, entered service 29 October 1997.

 P678 Pluvier, laid down 1995, launched 1996, entered service 18 December 1997.

References
 

Patrol vessels of the French Navy
Patrol boat classes